Alexei Komech (8 August 1936 – 28 February 2007) was a Russian preservationist, architectural historian and art critic who helped protect the cultural heritage of Moscow and Saint Petersburg for over 50 years. He was the Director of the Moscow Art History Institute and a member of the Moscow's City Government's Architectural Consultative Council.

Komech commanded immense respect in the city of Moscow and often battled with the mayor, Yury Luzhkov, and local developers to save the city's architectural heritage from the "substitution of historic sites with modern reproductions and theatrical imitations." He also served on the board of the Open Society Institute–Russia

'The city is interested in receiving so much [from construction] that it pushes the architecture council to allow anything,' he said. 'It has allow[ed developers] to destroy, to start anew, to build underground garages at the price of the historical part of the city. ... It's all at the expense of the city's history'

Publications
Komech, Alexei (1991) The Golden Ring: Cities of Old Russia. 
Gippenreiter, Vadim and Komech, Alexei (1991) Old Russian Cities.

References

External links
 "Tearing Down Moscow", Moscow Times - Crisis facing Moscow's historical buildings
 "New Moscow's Architecture: Harmony Or Cacophony?" Pravda  21 October 2003

1936 births
2007 deaths
Russian architectural historians
Komech
Komech
Komech
Komech